Mary Lilian Agnes Morris (13 December 1915 – 14 October 1988) was a Fijian born British actress.

Life and career
Morris was the daughter of Herbert Stanley Morris, a botanist, and his wife, Sylvia Ena de Creft-Harford. She trained at the Royal Academy of Dramatic Art.

Morris made her debut in Lysistrata at the Gate Theatre, London in 1936. She performed with Leslie Howard in "Pimpernel" Smith (1941) and Anna Petrovitch in the Ealing war movie Undercover (1943) as the wife of a Serbian guerrilla leader. On television, she played Professor Madeleine Dawnay in the science-fiction television drama A for Andromeda (and its sequel, The Andromeda Breakthrough), Queen Margaret in the BBC's An Age of Kings (a version of Shakespeare's History Plays), Lady Macbeth in the 1960 radio production of Macbeth, and Cleopatra in Antony and Cleopatra (as part of the BBC's adaptation of Shakespeare's Roman plays, The Spread of the Eagle) in 1963.

She played Number Two in The Prisoners episode "Dance of the Dead". After an absence of many years, she reappeared in diverse film roles such as Madame Fidolia the Russian ballerina and theatre school director in the BBC television serial Ballet Shoes (1975), and the mother of the murdered boy in the 1977 horror film Full Circle. She also appeared on television in Doctor Who in the story Kinda (1982), playing the pivotal role of the shaman Panna opposite Peter Davison.

Her other television appearances included the Countess Vronsky in the BBC's Anna Karenina (1977); the macabre, ancient relative in the Walter de la Mare story Seaton's Aunt (1983) in Granada Television's Shades of Darkness series; a recently deceased woman attempting to cheat death in a 1988 episode of HBO's Ray Bradbury Theater; Mrs Browning-Browning in Stephen Wyatt's Claws (BBC 1 1987); and the formidable matriarch in Police at the Funeral, an adaptation of one of Margery Allingham's Albert Campion stories for the BBC's Campion (1989).

In addition to her film role, she played Elizabeth the First on a 'Makers of History' LP record, using the queen's spoken and written words and contemporary music, issued by EMI in 1964.

Death
Morris died from heart failure, aged 72, on 14 October 1988 in Aigle, Switzerland.

Complete filmography

Feature films
Victoria the Great (1937) – Duchess of Kent
Prison Without Bars (1938) – Renee
The Spy in Black (1939) – Chauffeuse
The Thief of Bagdad (1940) – Halima/the Silver Maiden
Who Killed Jack Robins? (1940)
Major Barbara (1941) – A Girl
"Pimpernel" Smith (1941) – Ludmilla Koslowski
Undercover (1943) – Anna Petrovitch
The Man from Morocco (1945) – Sarah Duboste
The Agitator (1945) – Lettie Shackleton
Train of Events (1949) – Louise (segment "The Actor")
High Treason (1951) – Anna Braun
The Pythoness (1951) – Narrator (voice)
Full Circle (1977) – Greta Braden

Television

References

External links
 
 Profile, tv.com
 Profile, filmreference.com

1915 births
1988 deaths
Alumni of RADA
British film actresses
British stage actresses
British television actresses
British expatriates in Switzerland
People from Lautoka
20th-century British actresses
Fijian people of British descent
Fijian emigrants to the United Kingdom
Fijian people of Australian descent
British people of Australian descent